Urshak is a rural locality (a settlement) in Ufa, Bashkortostan, Russia. The population was 57 as of 2010.

Geography 
Urshak is located 21 km south of Ufa. Mokrousovo is the nearest rural locality.

References 

Rural localities in Ufa urban okrug